Petri Kokko (born February 1, 1975 in Oulu, Finland) is a professional ice hockey defenceman playing for the HC Energie Karlovy Vary hockey team.

Career statistics

References

External links 
 

1975 births
Living people
Sportspeople from Oulu
Finnish ice hockey defencemen
Ilves players
SaiPa players
Timrå IK players